William Jones Seabury (November 19, 1837 – August 30, 1916) was an American Episcopal priest, canon lawyer, and author. He was the son of Samuel Seabury (1801–1872) and great grandson of Bishop Samuel Seabury. William Jones Seabury was the father of notable American judge Samuel Seabury.

Bibliography 
Memoir of Bishop Seabury
Lectures on Apostolic Succession
An Introduction to the Study of Ecclesiastical Polity
Notes on the Constitution of 1901

References 
C.N. Shepard, "William Jones Seabury: A Memorial Sketch" in The Living Church, September 23, 1916, pp. 735–736.

External links 
Portrait

1837 births
1916 deaths
General Theological Seminary alumni
American Episcopal priests
19th-century American Episcopalians